Notre-Dame-de-Grâce—Lachine (formerly known as Lachine—Notre-Dame-de-Grâce) was a federal electoral district in Quebec, Canada, that was represented in the House of Commons of Canada from 1997 to 2015. Its population in 2006 was 104,715.

Geography
The district included the cities of Dorval and Montreal West, the borough of Lachine and the part of the neighbourhood of Notre-Dame-de-Grâce west of Hingston Avenue in the City of Montreal. The neighbouring ridings were Mount Royal, Westmount—Ville-Marie, LaSalle—Émard, Châteauguay—Saint-Constant, Lac-Saint-Louis, Pierrefonds—Dollard, and Saint-Laurent—Cartierville.

Political geography
The Liberals had their strongest support in NDG, but also had a lot of support in most of Lachine and Dorval. The Conservatives failed to win any polls, but were the strongest in Lachine and Dorval. The Bloc, despite finishing third in 2008, was very strong in eastern Lachine including Ville Saint-Pierre. The riding was won by the NDP in its 2011 sweep of the province.

History
The electoral district of "Lachine—Notre-Dame-de-Grâce" was created in 1996 from parts of Lachine—Lac-Saint-Louis and Notre-Dame-de-Grâce ridings. The name was changed to Notre-Dame-de-Grâce—Lachine in 1997 before the 1997 election was held.

Member of Parliament

This riding has elected the following Member of Parliament:

Election results

|align="left" colspan=2|Liberal hold
|align="right"|Swing
|align="right"| +1.0
|align="right"|

|align="left" colspan=2|Liberal hold
|align="right"|Swing
|align="right"| -3.85
|align="right"|

			
Note: Conservative vote is compared to the total of the Canadian Alliance vote and Progressive Conservative vote in 2000 election.

Note: Canadian Alliance vote is compared to the Reform vote in 1997 election.

See also
 List of Canadian federal electoral districts
 Past Canadian electoral districts

References

Riding history for Lachine—Notre-Dame-de-Grâce from the Library of Parliament
Riding history for Notre-Dame-de-Grâce—Lachine from the Library of Parliament
2011 Results from Elections Canada

Notes

Former federal electoral districts of Quebec
Dorval
Lachine, Quebec
Montreal West, Quebec